TARDIS is a fictional time machine and spacecraft in the television programme Doctor Who and its associated spin-offs.

TARDIS may also refer to:

 Somerton TARDIS, a police box in Newport, Wales
 3325 TARDIS, an asteroid
 Tardis Chasma, a chasma on the moon Charon
 Tornado Advanced Radar Display Information System, a part of the Panavia Tornado aircraft

See also
 Tardisbrücke ("Tardis bridge"), a settlement and bridge in Switzerland 
 Jacques Tardi (born 1946), French comics artist
 Tardigrade, water-dwelling, eight-legged, segmented micro-animals